Flamm is a surname. Notable persons with that name include:

Albert Flamm (1823–1906), German landscape painter
Ludwig Flamm (1885-1964), Austrian physicist
Fanchette Flamm, Austrian table tennis player
Donald Jason Flamm (1899–1998),  American radio pioneer